Pilsgate is a hamlet and former civil parish, now in the parish of Barnack, in the Peterborough district, in the ceremonial county of Cambridgeshire, England. In 1881 the parish had a population of 125.

History 
Pilsgate was recorded in the Domesday Book as Pillesgate. From 1866 Pilsgate was a civil parish in its own right until it was abolished on 24 March 1887 and merged with Barnack.

References

External links
 

Hamlets in Cambridgeshire
Former civil parishes in Cambridgeshire
Barnack